C.E. (Corinne) Dettmeijer-Vermeulen (The Hague, 1949) is a Dutch lawyer. She was Dutch National Rapporteur on Trafficking in Human Beings and Sexual Violence against Children, in Netherlands from 1 January 2006 to 15 November 2017 . Dettmeijer succeeded Anna Korvinus, who was appointed as the first National Rapporteur on 1 April 2000, and was succeeded by Herman Bolhaar herself in 2017.

Education
In 1973 Dettmeijer obtained her master's degree in law at Leiden University

Career
From 1980-1985, Dettmeijer was a Director of Public Prosecutions at the district prosecutor's office in Rotterdam. After 1985 she worked as a juvenile judge from 1985 to 1995.  she also served as the vice president of the court in The Hague from 1995 to 2014. Dettmeijer was decorated as an Officer in the Order of Orange-Nassau on November 13, 2017.

References

External links
Publicaties via recht.nl

20th-century Dutch judges
Sexual abuse
1949 births
Living people
Leiden University alumni
21st-century Dutch judges
Dutch women lawyers